Paphiopedilum bougainvilleanum is a species of orchid endemic to New Guinea.

Description 
Its leaves span 30-35 centimeters.

Taxonomy 
It was named by Fowlie, in Orchid Digest 35: 122. in 1971.

References

External links 

bougainvilleanum
Orchids of Borneo